Charlotteville is a hamlet  in the town of Summit, Schoharie County, New York, United States. The community has a post office with ZIP code 12036.

The Bute-Warner-Truax Farm, which is listed on the National Register of Historic Places, is located in Charlotteville.

References

Hamlets in Schoharie County, New York
Hamlets in New York (state)